Muda or MUDA or MuDA may refer to:

People 
Sultan Muda (1579–1579), nominal Sultan of Aceh
Tycho Muda (born 1988), Dutch rower
Vincent Muda (born 1988), Dutch rower

Places 
Muda, Estonia, a village
Mudá, Spain
Muda River, Malaysia
A mountain in Maharashtra, India; see Ghanchakkar

Organizations
Mysore Urban Development Authority, Karnataka, India
Mangalore Urban Development Authority, Karnataka, India
Malaysian United Democratic Alliance, a political party in Malaysia

Other uses 
MuDA, the museum of digital art in Zurich, Switzerland
Muda (cicada), genus of cicada
Muda (convoy), a Venetian shipping convoy
Muda (Japanese term), a Japanese term for "waste" or "useless", as used in lean manufacturing and agile software development
Muda Institute, an arts school in Ghent, Belgium
Muda language
Muda Station, in Ōyodo, Nara, Japan
Muda Tower or Torre dei Gualandi, a tower in Pisa, Italy
Muda, battle cry of Dio Brando, character in the JoJo's Bizarre Adventure franchise.